The Primus of the Scottish Episcopal Church, styled "The Most Reverend the Primus of the Scottish Episcopal Church", is the presiding bishop of the Scottish Episcopal Church.  The current Primus is the Most Revd. Mark Strange who became primus on 27 June 2017.

The word  literally means "first" in Latin and is cognate to the related episcopal title Primate.

Roles

The Primus of the Scottish Episcopal Church has the following tasks:
to preside at all provincial liturgical functions
to preside at all meetings of the General Synod of the Scottish Episcopal Church
to preside at all meetings of the Episcopal Synod
to declare and carry out the resolutions of the General Synod, the Episcopal Synod and the College of Bishops
to represent the Scottish Episcopal Church in its relation to all other churches of the Anglican Communion and other communions
to perform the functions and duties of primus as specified in the canons of the Scottish Episcopal Church
to correspond on behalf of the Scottish Episcopal Church with primates, metropolitans and the secretary general of the Anglican Consultative Council.

History
The primus does not have any metropolitan jurisdiction. Metropolitan responsibilities are held by the diocesan bishops. The last head of the Scottish Episcopal Church to hold both primate and metropolitan titles was Arthur Rose, Archbishop of St Andrews, up to his death in 1704. The last bishop to exercise metropolitan authority was Alexander Rose, Bishop of Edinburgh, up to his death in 1720.

Bishops elected as primus
Holders of the role since the creation of the post in the early 18th century.

See also
Religion in the United Kingdom

References

Bibliography

Scottish Episcopal Church
Scottish
 
Bishops by type